Raj Munni Sabu more commonly known as Aiman Athirah Al Jundi is a Malaysian politician who has served as the Deputy Minister of Women, Family and Community Development in the Pakatan Harapan (PH) administration under Prime Minister Anwar Ibrahim since December 2022 and the Member of Parliament (MP) for Sepang since November 2022. She served as the Senator from August 2018 to August 2021. She is a member of the National Trust Party (AMANAH), a component party of the PH coalition. She has also served as the 3rd Women Chief of PH since September 2021 and 2nd Women Chief of AMANAH since December 2019.

Education 
Athirah is a graduate of Universiti Sains Malaysia, where she earned a bachelor's degree in Social Science with a major in political science and a minor in Islamic Studies.

Political career 
Prior to joining Amanah, Aiman Athirah was a member of the PAS political party. She began her political career by joining PAS, but left the party after the defeat of PAS Deputy President Mohamad Sabu in a party election. She then joined Amanah, a new party founded by Mohamad Sabu.

Aiman Athirah has held several positions within her party, including PAS Women Head of Information and PAS Women Acting Director of Elections. She has also been a member of the Supreme Committee of the Central Pakatan Rakyat Women's Council.

In addition to her political career, Aiman Athirah has been involved with various community and non-governmental organizations (NGOs). She has worked with the Oppressed People's Network (JERIT) to fight for issues of interest to the working class, and with EMPOWER to promote women's empowerment programs. She has also been involved with BERSIH, a coalition of NGOs demanding clean elections, and has been an activist for the People's Awakening in the Coalition of PROTES and the Movement to Abolish the Internal Security Act (ISA).

Aiman Athirah has also been involved in efforts to protest the rising prices of goods and the privatisation of health and medical services. She has been an activist for the anti-war movement and a member of the Secretariat Committee of the Anti Tail Suit and Anti AES Campaign.

In the 15th General Election (GE15), Aiman Athirah contested the Sepang parliamentary seat and won with a majority of 8949 votes.

Election results

References 

Living people
Former Malaysian Islamic Party politicians
Members of the Dewan Rakyat
Women members of the Dewan Rakyat
21st-century Malaysian politicians
21st-century Malaysian women politicians
National Trust Party (Malaysia) politicians
1972 births